MarinaBlue, also known as Marina Blue, is a skyscraper in Miami, Florida, United States. It is located in northeastern Downtown, on Biscayne Bay along the west side of Biscayne Boulevard. The tower was one of the first buildings in Park West to be completed. Built by Hyperion Development, the developers of another building named Blue on the Bay further uptown, the building finished construction in May 2007. Marinablue is located across the street from the Miami-Dade Arena. The building rises , and has 57 floors. Marinablue is almost all-residential, with some retail and office space on the lower floors. The building was opened to residential occupancy since the spring of 2008. The building currently stands as the 9th-tallest in Miami and the 10th-tallest in Florida, as well as the 5th-tallest residential building in the city and the state.

Gallery

See also
 List of tallest buildings in Miami
 List of tallest buildings in Florida
 Downtown Miami

References

 Marina Blue - Emporis
 Marinablue - SkyscraperPage

Buildings and structures completed in 2007
Residential skyscrapers in Miami
Skyscraper office buildings in Miami
2007 establishments in Florida
Arquitectonica buildings